Vijay Shankar Telang (17 March 1952 – 18 June 2013) was an Indian cricketer who played for, captained, and later coached Vidarbha cricket team.

A right-hand batsman and very occasional medium-fast bowler who was born in Nagpur, Maharashtra, Telang played 58 first-class and one day matches for Vidarbha in the Ranji Trophy and Deodhar Trophy between 1970 and 1986, scoring nearly 3,000 runs.

After retirement, he became a coach for the domestic team's U-16 and U-19 sides, and later also became a selector for the First XI team. In 2012 he became the First XI coach, however he was diabetic and retired only months later on health grounds, and died less than a year later, aged 61.
Played for central zone against visiting West Indies team. Scored 64 runs same as Dilip Vengsarkar who scored 64 and got selected to play for India.

References

External links
 
 

1952 births
2013 deaths
Cricketers from Nagpur
Vidarbha cricketers
Central Zone cricketers
Indian cricketers
Indian cricket coaches